Live from Etown: 2006 Christmas Special is a holiday album by Canadian singer-songwriter Sarah McLachlan, released in January 2007. It was produced by longtime collaborator Pierre Marchand.

Track listing
 "Building a Mystery" – 4:21
 "River" – 4:07
 "Adia" – 4:19
 "Wintersong" (Sarah McLachlan) – 3:34
 "Push" – 3:58
 "In The Bleak Midwinter" – 3:56
 "Angel" – 5:52
 "Happy Christmas" (Performing with Leigh Nash, Nick Forster, and Helen Forster) – 3:52

References

2006 Christmas albums
2006 live albums
Christmas albums by Canadian artists
Pop Christmas albums
Live Christmas albums
Sarah McLachlan live albums
Sarah McLachlan EPs
Albums produced by Pierre Marchand
2006 EPs
Live EPs